Aquaman has made several appearances in numerous adaptations since his comic book debut in 1941. The character has also been referenced beyond the scope of traditional comics entertainment.

Television

Animated

Aquaman's first media appearance was as the star of his own animated series, The Superman/Aquaman Hour of Adventure, in 1967 and 1968. The series, narrated by Ted Knight, proved to be a success for everyone, including Filmation studios as it cemented their reputation as a leading provider of Saturday morning programming, the CBS television network - where it was a top rated show making CBS the leading network on Saturday mornings, and of course it was a hit with the viewers, briefly making Aquaman a household name among kids at the time, as well as comic-book fans who consider it a superior showcase for the character than the better known Super Friends series that followed 5 years later. The series featured Mera, Aqualad, a pet walrus named Tusky and Aquaman's and Aqualad's large seahorses, named Storm and Imp respectively. In addition to his usual array of abilities, this version of Aquaman had the power to throw "water balls", which had considerable concussive impact. Aquaman's character voice was provided by Marvin Miller, who was then better known as the voice of Robby the Robot from Forbidden Planet.

Super Friends
He was also a major character in the original season of the animated television series Super Friends (1973). In this series, Aquaman was shown to display superstrength as seen when he was hefting a bulldozer blade over his head, for example, and using it to help stop a tidal wave. He also had encyclopedic knowledge of oceanography and oceanology, in addition to his more familiar water-breathing power and aquatic telepathy. However, this series has been blamed for making Aquaman unpopular, and even laughable, by reinforcing a weak image of the character. In the first two seasons of Super Friends, he was voiced by Norman Alden, and for the rest of the series he was voiced by Bill Callaway.

The Aquaman & Friends Action Hour
The Aquaman & Friends Action Hour aired on Cartoon Network Latin America in 2003 and was produced by Wild Hare Studios of Atlanta, GA. The show, which lasted 7 episodes, was a parody of Aquaman's appearances on Super Friends. In this series, Aquaman is now the host of a children's television series. He is being pursued by the Legion of Doom, who had spent their entire operating budget on attempts to conquer the world and now have to rent out parts of the Hall of Doom as apartments to generate income. Aquaman was chosen as the lead character in this parody series because the producers were not allowed to use the full cast of the Super Friends due to Justice League airing in the United States. The series is separate from the Cartoon Network commercials that aired in the United States that featured Aquaman and Wonder Woman being saved from the Legion of Doom by The Powerpuff Girls and the Aquaman Dance Party commercials that aired during Adult Swim.
Also aired on Tooncast since 2008.

DC animated universe

Superman: The Animated Series
Aquaman appeared in the Superman: The Animated Series episode "A Fish Story", voiced by Miguel Ferrer.  In the episode, Aquaman, regarded as an urban legend, comes into conflict with Lex Luthor when one of Luthor's undersea construction plans starts causing damage to Aquaman's home, Atlantis. As King of Atlantis, he tries to stop the tests peacefully but his "peaceful" attempts are "met with violence and capture". Lois Lane finds him a prisoner of LexCorp's institute, and she is in turn captured and taken to be killed with him, but Aquaman manages to escape with Lois and returns to stop the tests under the ocean. He almost attacks the surface world with his army, but Superman dissuades him from doing so. When Aquaman tries to leave peacefully, one of Luthor's men tries to shoot him in the back, unsuccessfully, and Aquaman's army in turn destroys Luthor's vessel. Aquaman advises Superman to make sure the "surface dwellers" show more respect to the oceans in the future before disappearing.

Batman Beyond
As seen in the two-part Batman Beyond episode "The Call", Aquaman's daughter Aquagirl is a member of a future Justice League. During the episode, Terry McGinnis/Batman goes over profiles of the current Justice League members. According to Aquagirl's profile, Aquaman is currently missing.

Justice League/Justice League Unlimited
Aquaman appears in several episodes of the animated television series Justice League and Justice League Unlimited, voiced by Scott Rummell. This version was based closely on the hot-headed antihero persona (the producers were aiming for "Conan underwater") of the 1994 and 2001 Aquaman comic book series, with the Viking-like appearance and hook prostheses. Here, he sacrificed his hand to save his infant son from being killed in a plot against his life by his evil brother Orm; Aquaman and his son were chained to a rock that was falling towards an underwater magma flow, and Aquaman only had time to free his right arm from his chains before cutting off his left hand to escape his remaining bonds. In the season two episode, "Hereafter", he is listed as a member of the Justice League on the Watchtower database after Superman was sent into the future. He later appeared in an homage episode alongside Superman, Batman, and Wonder Woman that pitted them against the Ultimen, modern pastiches of Samurai, Apache Chief, Black Vulcan, and the Wonder Twins from the Super Friends (Wind Dragon, Longshadow, Juice, Downpour, and Shifter, respectively). According to the website Television Without Pity, producers created Devil Ray and removed Aquaman and Black Manta from the series before the episode "To Another Shore" because the rights to Aquaman were no longer available due to an embargo on the characters because of the proposed and unaired Aquaman series.

Batman: The Brave and the Bold
Aquaman was a regular supporting character on the television series Batman: The Brave and the Bold, voiced by John DiMaggio. As always, Aquaman is king of Atlantis and protector of all the seas. Batman describes him as a friendly, happy-go-lucky adventurer with a "larger-than-life" personality; he has habits of giving his exploits titles such as "The Mystery of The Stolen Statue" and "The Secret of the Mechanical Sea Monster", and telling these tales to anyone within distance of his voice. He uses the phrase "Outrageous!" whenever he is shocked and peppers his speech with sea-based references. As always, he can breathe underwater, has super strength and the ability to communicate telepathically with sea life. Like other televised versions of Aquaman, he could manipulate the water around him; creating balls, swords, and shields. His character design is based primarily on his classic character design, but with a beard. In the series finale "Mitefall!", Bat-Mite attempts to get the series cancelled by making it jump the shark in as many ways as possible; this includes changing Aquaman's voice actor from John DiMaggio to Ted McGinley (regarded as the "patron saint" of shark-jumping). Ambush Bug (voiced by Henry Winkler) manages to restore the hero's original voice by getting "Aquaman" to admit to being McGinley. The Crime Syndicate counterpart of Aquaman appears in episode "Deep Cover for Batman!" and is named Sea King.

Young Justice
Aquaman appears as a member of the JLA in Young Justice, voiced by Phil LaMarr. He resembles his bearded appearance, but wears a type of footwear that exposes the heel and toe areas of his feet. In "Independence Day", he and Aqualad end up defeating Killer Frost in Hawaii. He and the other adult mentors of the sidekicks end up called away to help Zatara and the other Justice League members prevent Wotan from blotting out the sun. In "Fireworks", he and the other Justice League members arrive at the ruined Cadmus building following Aqualad, Kid Flash, Robin, and Superboy's fight with Blockbuster. When the sidekicks and Superboy wanted some involvement with the Justice League, Aquaman ends up agreeing with Batman and Green Arrow resulting in the formation of Young Justice. In "Downtime", Aquaman tells Aqualad that he had learned what happened following the team's fight with Clayface from Batman (who deduced that Aqualad's homesickness for Atlantis is why the team was defeated). Aquaman ends up called away to help the Justice League with a fire breakout in California. In "Auld Acquaintace" Aquaman is controlled by Klarion and briefly fights Aqualad, but is defeated by his sidekick.

In Season 2, which is set five years after season 1, Aquaman is now partners with Lagoon Boy, and is crushed upon discovering that Kaldur'am has been corrupted and joined forces with his father Black Manta. Kaldur'am claims he could not trust Aquaman as he had kept the identity of Black Manta a secret from Kaldur'am. Aquaman states that it was a mistake, and tries to convince him that no one need suffer for it, but Aqualad angrily attacks his teacher. It is later revealed that Aqualad's corruption is truly a facade created so that he may infiltrate the supercriminal organization, the Light.

In Season 3, which is set two years after season 2, Arthur has given up the title of the Aquaman to Kaldur and looks more like his bearded appearance just with the addition of a crown on his head. He currently is just the king of Poseidonis as he chose to give up his heroism because his family needed him more.

Mad
Aquaman appears in the Mad episode "That's What Super Friends are For", trying to appeal to Superman, Batman, and Wonder Woman about being called "Super Friends." He also appears on a skit called "Aquaman vs. Wild", voiced by John DiMaggio.

Teen Titans Go!
In the Teen Titans Go! episode "Matched", Cyborg creates a computer program that can tell a person who their romantic match is and when Starfire goes first, her perfect match turns out to be Aquaman. Starfire at first doesn't warm up to the idea of being with Aquaman, but then begins to fall for Aquaman after reading a magazine article about him and stares at a poster of him. Robin though tries to impress her by swimming 200 laps in the pool and then flexing his muscles to Starfire while in his bathing suit. He then creates a costume out of rotten fish like Aquaman, but it does not go so well due to the awful smell from the costume. Later, at Beast Boy and Raven's wedding, Starfire is seen sitting in the audience with Aquaman while Robin sits beside them, moping. Then, Cyborg shows up and tells them that there was a glitch in his match-making program and it turns out that Starfire and Beast Boy's perfect match is a scratching post. Starfire and Beast Boy then battle over the scratching post while Robin and Aquaman cry together after being rejected by Starfire. In "Don't Press Play", he is voiced by Greg Cipes. In "Finding Aquaman", he is voiced by Patrick Warburton.

Aquaman: King of Atlantis
In January 2020, it was announced that HBO Max would develop a three-part miniseries titled Aquaman: King of Atlantis, produced by James Wan. Aquaman is voiced by Cooper Andrews. The series premiered on October 14, 2021, but was later removed from HBO Max in August 2022 alongside several other series due to the company's cost-cutting measures.

Harley Quinn
Aquaman appears in Harley Quinn, voiced by Chris Diamantopoulos. In "Finding Mr. Right", he has a cameo watching Batman's fight with Harley Quinn, Poison Ivy, and Joker on his phone. In "L.O.D.R.S.V.P" after Harley's crew steals jewels from Atlantis, he pursues them to the Legion of Doom's headquarters and beats up several villains while demanding them. Harley tricks him into breaking an aquarium, causing him to scoop up the fish and leave to take them to a body of water.

South Park
Co-creator Trey Parker voices Seaman, modeled after Aquaman from the Super Friends cartoon, is a member of the Super Best Friends, a superhero organization composed of prominent religious figures, Seaman being the exception. He is constantly mocked by the other team members, who pronounce his name "semen". This joke is intensified by Seaman's bird sidekick "Swallow" and Seaman's call: 'Swallow, come!". Also, the initials SM, printed on his chest, add to the sexual innuendo of the character.

DC Super Hero Girls
Arthur Curry appears in the episode, "#TheAquamanCometh", voiced by Will Friedle.

Live-action

Smallville
Arthur "AC" Curry appeared in an episode of the television series Smallville titled "Aqua", which aired on October 20, 2005. The episode features Arthur investigating the devastating effects on marine life from a project Lex Luthor has been developing for the U.S. military. He briefly dates Lois Lane before leaving to continue his fight for the ecosystem. Like his Filmation counterpart, this version of the character is shown to have the power to throw "water balls" having tremendous concussive impact; he can also swim faster than Clark Kent. This version of the character wears an orange and green costume because he attends the University of Miami, whose team colors are green, orange, and white.

Arthur was played by former American Idol contestant Alan Ritchson. In an allusion to the HBO series Entourage, in which a successful Aquaman feature exists, when Arthur is asked which environmental group he is working for, he responds "I don't travel with an 'entourage'." "Aqua" was the highest-rated episode that season.

Ritchson reprised his role in the 2006 (season 6) episode "Justice", as a member of Green Arrow's unnamed superhero team. Along with Victor "Cyborg" Stone and Bart "Impulse" Allen, they fought to stop Lex Luthor from creating an army of superhumans. During this second appearance, he is using the codename "Aquaman", and wears a costume similar to his traditional one.

In episode one of season 8, Arthur, Black Canary, and Oliver are all searching for Clark who had disappeared after the finale of the previous season. They succeed in finding Clark, but Arthur and Canary are captured by Tess Mercer. In the end of the episode, Arthur severs ties to the other members of the team when their identities are compromised. He returns in the season 10 episode "Patriot" with his new wife Mera to help Clark save Oliver from Slade Wilson.

Aquaman pilot

The CW had announced a live action Aquaman television series, entitled Aquaman (also referred to as Mercy Reef), but on May 18, 2006, it was confirmed that The CW did not pick up the show for the 2006/2007 schedule. Reports (beginning after the upfronts) said The CW was still considering Aquaman for midseason due to interest piqued by the leaked promotional trailer. The pilot episode is available at Apple's iTunes Music Store Xbox Live Video Marketplace and is on the Justice League: Crisis on Two Earths Blu-ray as a special feature. It was also broadcast on Canada's YTV on June 9, 2007. It starred Justin Hartley as Arthur Curry/Aquaman, with supporting roles by Ving Rhames and Lou Diamond Phillips. There have been no talks of picking up the series since June 2006.

The Flash
In the second-season The Flash episode "The Darkness and the Light", Hunter Zolomon (disguised as Jay Garrick) made reference to a close friend from Atlantis.

Batwoman
In the second-season Batwoman episoded "Time Off For Good Behavior", Luke Fox jokes that the next person Black Mask blames for his daughter's death will be Aquaman.

In the third-season episode "Loose Tooth", Aquaman was mentioned in the opening scene.

Peacemaker
Momoa made an uncredited cameo appearance as Aquaman in the Peacemaker season finale episode "It's Cow or Never".

The Big Bang Theory
Aquaman is frequently referenced in The Big Bang Theory, where the main characters often argue as to which superhero is better. One of them also dresses like him when going to a costume contest or for Halloween. During a panel interaction with the crowd at Comic-Con 2014, a member of the audience asked the writers of The Big Bang Theory why Aquaman sometimes got a bad rap at the show. After answering her question, they realized that the member asking the question was Marianne Norris, the granddaughter of Paul Norris, the creator of Aquaman.

Film

Live-action

Development of an Aquaman film
In 2007, Santiago Cabrera was cast as Aquaman in a Justice League film called Justice League: Mortal. However, the movie was shelved later in the year.
There have been plans to produce an Aquaman film since 2003. Sunrise Entertainment's Alan and Peter Riche planned to bring Aquaman to the big screen for Warner Bros. with Ben Grant, a first time writer, writing the screenplay. However, the film fell through. Years later, it was reported that an Aquaman film was in development at Leonardo DiCaprio's Appian Way Productions, though that film also was never created.

DC Extended Universe

Following the release of Man of Steel, Geoff Johns told Variety that Aquaman was a priority character for the company. He would be played by Jason Momoa.

Man of Steel (2013)
Momoa confirmed in an interview with DC All Access that the character appeared off-screen in Man of Steel to help Superman after saving workers from an oil rig explosion.

Batman v Superman: Dawn of Justice (2016)
The character made his live-action theatrical debut with Batman v Superman: Dawn of Justice, released worldwide March 25, 2016, with Jason Momoa playing him. He is seen when Wonder Woman watches several video files of metahuman sightings.

Suicide Squad (2016)
Aquaman appears in a photo in Suicide Squad.

Justice League and Zack Snyder's Justice League (2017/2021)
In October 2014, Momoa revealed that Aquaman would appear in Justice League in 2017. In an official special footage prepared by Warner Brothers for San Diego Comic-Con 2016, he is seen to be reluctant to fight alongside other Justice League members at first when Bruce Wayne went to his hometown to seek his support to fight against an extraterrestrial enemy. When Superman was revived, Aquaman helped to fight the confused Kryptonian. He helps Batman's allies fight Steppenwolf as Superman arrives to turn the tide. The 2021 directors cut entitled Zack Snyder's Justice League gives more emphasisus to his relationships with Vulko and Mera.

Aquaman (2018)
It was announced on August 12, 2014, that Warner Bros. had hired screenwriters Will Beall and Kurt Johnstad to pen two separate scripts for an upcoming Aquaman film. The film was being developed on dual tracks, meaning that two scripts will be written, one by Beall and one by Johnstad, but only the better version will move forward. It was announced that Aquaman will be released in 2018 as the seventh installment of the DC Extended Universe, with Momoa starring. The studio was looking at Jeff Nichols and Noam Murro to direct the film. On April 10, 2015, The Hollywood Reporter announced that James Wan is being considered to direct the film. On June 3, 2015, Deadline reported that Wan has signed on to direct the film and will oversee script duties with Johnstad. On November 12, 2015, The Hollywood Reporter reported that David Leslie Johnson will be writing the film's script. In January 2016, Variety reported that Amber Heard was in talks for the role of Mera in this film and the two part Justice League film. Months later, Heard was confirmed to Entertainment Tonight that she will be portraying Mera. It was announced that the film will be set after Justice League and it will not be an origin story. Wan also stated that he choose directing the film over The Flash. In April 2016, actor Willem Dafoe was cast as Nuidis Vulko. On July 22, 2016, The Hollywood Reporter reported that Will Beall will be writing the film, based on the story treatment from James Wan and Geoff Johns. On August 10, 2016, The Wrap reported that Black Manta will be the film's main antagonist. In September 2016, it was announced that the film will be shot in Australia in 2017. Wan stated in an interview that the film is a "swashbuckling action adventure, sort of high seas adventure story. A quest story in the spirit of Raiders of the Lost Ark and Romancing the Stone and there will be a dynamic between Arthur and Mera start off as a love-hate relationship where they don't quite click and as time goes by and they try to work together they get closer and closer". The film went into pre-production in Queensland, Australia in November 2016 and began shooting in 2017. On December 2, 2016, Warner Bros. announced a new release date of October 5, 2018. On December 12, 2016, Deadline reported that Patrick Wilson was cast as Ocean Master. On December 29, 2016, it was announced that Keir Beck and his stunt team would work on the film. On January 31, 2017, Nicole Kidman and Yahya Abdul-Mateen II were cast as Queen Atlanna and Black Manta, respectively. On February 3, 2017, Temuera Morrison was cast as Aquaman's father. On February 20, Wan confirmed it on Twitter that cinematographer Don Burgess, who previously worked with Wan on The Conjuring 2, will serve as cinematographer for Aquaman. On March 16, it was announced that the movie will be delayed from the October release date, to December 21, 2018. On April 12, it was revealed that Dolph Lundgren had joined the film and plays King Nereus of Xebel.

Animated

Animated theatrical films

The Lego Movie
Aquaman made a no-line cameo appearance at the end of The Lego Movie.

The Lego Batman Movie
Aquaman appears in The Lego Batman Movie, at the Justice League 57th Anniversary Party. Although having a slightly larger role than in The Lego Movie he still has no lines.

The Lego Movie 2: The Second Part
Jason Momoa reprises his role as Aquaman in The Lego Movie 2: The Second Part in his DCEU appearance. He assists in fighting the invasion from the Systar System. Then Aquaman was seen in Harmony Town with the Justice League as he tells Superman that General Zod made a leaf walk. The original Aquaman also makes a cameo. There was also an appearance by a character called "Rip-Off Aquaman".

DC Super Heroes vs. Eagle Talon
Aquaman appears in DC Super Heroes vs. Eagle Talon, voiced by Kazuya Nakai.

Teen Titans Go! To the Movies
Aquaman appears in Teen Titans Go! To the Movies, voiced by Eric Bauza.

Space Jam: A New Legacy
Aquaman has a cameo appearance in the 2021 live action/animated hybrid film Space Jam: A New Legacy. He is shown in the DC part of the Warner Bros. 3000 server-verse with other members of the Justice League after Superman stopped a runaway train that Daffy Duck caused.

Injustice
Aquaman appears in the animated film Injustice, voiced by Derek Phillips.

DC League of Super-Pets (2022)
Aquaman appears in DC League of Super-Pets, voiced by Jemaine Clement.

Direct to DVD

Adam Green's Aquaman
Filmmaker Adam Green (creator of the Hatchet series, as well as director of the first two) was commissioned to write a screenplay for an animated Aquaman film, which was ultimately not produced.

Justice League: The New Frontier
Alan Ritchson reprised his role as Arthur Curry/Aquaman for a cameo appearance in the animated film: Justice League: The New Frontier (2008), based on the graphic novel DC: The New Frontier. In this film, he is referred to as "Arthur of Atlantis". He and some Atlantean doctors were seen treating Superman's injuries.

Justice League: Crisis On Two Earths
Aquaman appears in Justice League: Crisis on Two Earths, voiced by Josh Keaton. He assists Batman in fighting off Superwoman on board the Justice League satellite. In a flashback of the Martian Manhunter, it is hinted that he was a member of the Justice League prior to the events in the movie.

Justice League: The Flashpoint Paradox
Aquaman appears in the film Justice League: The Flashpoint Paradox (2013), voiced by Cary Elwes.

In the true present day, Aquaman helps save one of Flash's rogues from Reverse-Flash's bombs. In a different present day created by Flash's going back in time to stop his mother's death, Aquaman is shown to be more ruthless and bulkier. He and Wonder Woman attempted to have an alliance between Atlantis and Themyscira, ending up having an affair; his wife saw them and ended up perishing in a fight with Wonder Woman to defend her claim on her husband. The resulting war caused chaos on a global scale, resulting in Aquaman's capture of Captain Atom; he had him used as the source of a bomb to take out the Amazons and himself as a last resort. At the end of the film, he does just that, forcing Flash to head back in time to avert the disaster and restore the true present day.

JLA Adventures: Trapped In Time
Aquaman appears in the film JLA Adventures: Trapped in Time, voiced by Liam O'Brien.

Justice League: Throne of Atlantis
Aquaman appears as the main protagonist in the animated film Justice League: Throne of Atlantis, voiced by Matt Lanter. In the film Arthur Curry starts off with no idea that he is half-Atlantean, due to his mother being the princess of Atlantis and promised to someone else; in the present she is the Queen, and trying to keep Arthur's half-brother Orm under control after Darkseid's attack in Justice League: War cost the King of Atlantis his life. At the time, Arthur has just lost his father and is being watched over by Mera, his mother's loyal right-hand woman. After Black Manta orders an assassination attempt on him, Arthur is brought to the royal armory by Mera; there, he dresses in what would become his costume. Arthur confronts Orm, with the help of the Justice League, but learns that Orm murdered their mother so he could wage war against the surface world. In the midst of the battle, Arthur learns Black Manta had manipulated Orm and summons a shark to swallow him. Thanks to Cyborg's technology, they are able to play Orm's confession of murder to the troops; Arthur takes his place as king, wanting to bridge the surface and Atlantean worlds in peace. Much to his annoyance, Arthur is given the codename Aquaman by Shazam.

Justice League Dark
Aquaman makes a non-speaking cameo appearance in the animated film Justice League Dark.

Scooby-Doo! & Batman: The Brave and the Bold
Aquaman appears in the film Scooby-Doo! & Batman: The Brave and the Bold, voiced again by John DiMaggio.

The Death of Superman
Aquaman appears in The Death of Superman, with Matt Lanter reprising his role. He is among the members of the Justice League who battle Doomsday, although they end up subdued before Superman arrives to defeat the creature. He is shown alongside the other Leaguers in the end attending to Superman's funeral.

Lego DC Comics Super Heroes: Aquaman: Rage of Atlantis
Aquaman appears as the main protagonist in the film Lego DC Comics Super Heroes: Aquaman: Rage of Atlantis, voiced by Dee Bradley Baker.

DC Super Hero Girls: Legends of Atlantis
Aquaman appears in DC Super Hero Girls: Legends of Atlantis, voiced by Max Mittelman.

Justice League Dark: Apokolips War
Aquaman makes a non-speaking cameo appearance in the animated film, Justice League Dark: Apokolips War. He joins the rest of the Justice League in a counter-attack against Darkseid. He is killed by Darkseid's Omega Beams after arriving and being ambushed on Apokolips by the Paradooms.

Justice Society: World War II
A variation of the Earth-Two Aquaman appears in Justice Society: World War II, voiced by Liam McIntyre. A villain called Advisor mind-controls him into leading the Atlanteans and the sea monsters from the trench into attacking North America to make way for the Nazi invasion. Aquaman does engage Wonder Woman who defeats him and breaks his trident. After Flash defeats Advisor enough to break Aquaman free from the mind-control, Aquaman sees what is happening and quotes "What have I done"? He then proceeds to retreat into the ocean with the sea monsters.

Teen Titans Go! & DC Super Hero Girls: Mayhem in the Multiverse
Aquaman appears in  Teen Titans Go! & DC Super Hero Girls: Mayhem in the Multiverse, voiced again by Will Friedle.

Batman and Superman: Battle of the Super Sons
Aquaman appears in Batman and Superman: Battle of the Super Sons, with Dee Bradley Baker reprising his role from various Lego DC films, including Batman Be-Leaguered and Aquaman: Rage of Atlantis.

Video games

 Aquaman appeared in the Justice League Task Force Super Nintendo Entertainment System and Sega Mega Drive video game as well as in Aquaman: Battle for Atlantis for Xbox and GameCube. Battle for Atlantis is often cited as among the worst video games ever made.
 Aquaman appeared as an unlockable character in the Justice League Heroes game for Xbox and PlayStation 2. He can be unlocked by paying 27 orange shields when collected. His powers are chiefly water-based, creating hard water weapons such as a sword, whirlpool tornadoes and water-blasts.
 The prequel comic book for the video game Mortal Kombat vs. DC Universe shows that Arthur Joseph was one of the many characters killed by the violent merger of the two earths prior to the beginning of the game.
 Aquaman appears as a supporting character in Batman: The Brave and the Bold – The Videogame, voiced by John DiMaggio.
 Aquaman appears in the DC Universe Online video game voiced by Jens Anderson. Circe ends up mind-controlling Aquaman into attacking the surface world causing the players to assist Martian Manhunter into fighting both of them. When under the control of Circe, Aquaman is served by Brine Hatchlings, Brine Hulks, Cancer Makos, Cancer Threshers, Kitefins, Pisces Makos, Sandtigers, Scorpio Kitefins, Scorpio Makos, Threshers, Tidepool Kitefins, Tigersharks, Whitetips, and a Trident of Poseidon.
 Aquaman appears as a playable character in the multiplayer battle arena game Infinite Crisis, voiced by Josh Keaton.
 Aquaman appears as a playable character in DC Unchained.

Lego
 Aquaman is a playable character in Lego Batman 2: DC Super Heroes. He is voiced by Brian Bloom.
 Aquaman appears as a playable character in Lego Batman 3: Beyond Gotham, voiced by Scott Porter.
 Aquaman is a playable character in Lego Dimensions, with Brian Bloom reprising the role.
 Aquaman appears as a playable character in Lego DC Super-Villains, with Scott Porter reprising the role, while his Crime Syndicate counterpart Sea King is voiced by Dee Bradley Baker. This incarnation of Sea-King is present with his teammates as opposed to both his demise and possession by Deadman in the comics. The cinematic incarnation of Aquaman appears in a two part DLC inspired by the film, with said incarnation voiced by Lex Lang.

Injustice
Aquaman appears as a playable character in the Injustice video games by Neatherrealm Studios, with Phil LaMarr reprising his role from Young Justice. In the first game, he had downloadable alternate costumes based on his appearances in Flashpoint and Blackest Night.

In the first game, Aquaman is one of the Justice League members taken from the primary universe into an alternate world where Superman and his Regime rule over the planet. They are recruited by that world's Batman into the fight against the tyrannical Superman. In Aquaman's chapter in the story, he goes to Atlantis to learn more about the history of this alternate dimension in the midst of the alternate Aquaman's treaty negotiation with Flash and Shazam. When he discovers that the alternate Aquaman plans to register Atlantis under the Regime (thus giving Superman control over Atlantis), he becomes enraged at his counterpart's willingness to yield and defeats his alternate self as well as the Regime versions of Flash and Shazam before joining Batman's Insurgency to combat Superman. In the game's climax, the alternate Aquaman leads an Atlantean siege on Metropolis by High Councilor Superman's orders before he and the Atlanteans are stopped by the primary Superman and the Amazons. In his single player ending, he unites the world's oceans under the banner of Atlantis and gained a controlling interest in the planet's economy and ecology. The world's multinational corporations hired assassins to end his reign, but the world's citizens rose up in anger to those who would quell Aquaman's influence. After the threats desisted, a groundswell of support began for a United Earth under Aquaman's command.

In the second game, the alternate Aquaman initially refuses to help Batman combat against Brainiac's forces as he does not want to get dragged into another surface world conflict, but Green Lantern does convince Arthur to lend some of his Atlantean forces to help after Atlantis starts to become invaded by Brainiac. Eventually, Atlantis and its people become captured by Brainiac, with Aquaman managing to escape before he is caught with them. He volunteers to assist Black Adam in using the Rock of Eternity to take out Brainiac's defenses, as his trident would act as a suitable conduit to direct the Rock's power. They arrive in Kahndaq and are attacked by Grodd, who fights the two kings alongside the brainwashed Green Arrow, Black Canary, and Blue Beetle. Aquaman kills Grodd to avenge the Atlanteans abducted by Brainiac before he and Black Adam successfully lower Brainiac's defenses. On Brainiac's ship, Arthur is pleased to find out that Superman managed to restore Atlantis from Brainac's ship. In Batman and Superman's conflict over whether to spare Brainiac, he sides with Superman as he believes leaving Brainiac alive would be too risky and is fine with killing his enemies as it matches Atlantis' old fashioned sense of justice. He is defeated by Batman on the ship, as Batman puts Arthur out of commission by stabbing his leg with the Atlantean Trident. In his single player ending, Superman rises to power once again with Brainiac's death and Batman's defeat. Aquaman couldn't muster a force powerful enough to combat Superman to prevent the High Councilor from taking over Atlantis again. The Atlanteans discover a hidden Insurgency hideout underwater that contained Lex Luthor's interdimensional portal. After his scientists fix the portal, Aquaman uses it to travel to the primary universe from the first game to request their help in stopping Superman once again while also begging for their forgiveness.

Fortnite
Aquaman appears as a cosmetic outfit in Fortnite. The outfit was released on June 17, 2020, and was available as the secret Battle Pass outfit.

References